Censorship in Nazi Germany was extreme and strictly enforced by the governing Nazi Party, but specifically by Joseph Goebbels and his Reich Ministry of Public Enlightenment and Propaganda. Censorship within Nazi Germany included control of all forms of mass communication, which included newspaper, music, literature, radio, and film. The same body also produced and disseminated their own literature which were solely devoted to furthering Nazi ideas and myths. Anti-semitism lay at the core of their works, including 1940 films such as Jud Süß and The Eternal Jew. The ministry promoted the cult of Adolf Hitler by sponsoring early films such as Triumph of the Will of the 1934 rally and The Victory of Faith made in 1933, and which survives now as a single copy recently discovered in the UK. It was banned by the Nazis owing to the prominent role of Ernst Roehm, who was murdered by Hitler on the Night of the Long Knives in 1934.

Media
The ministry tightly controlled information available to their citizens. Almost all Modernist art, such as Impressionism and Expressionism, was considered degenerate art by the Nazi regime, and much modern music such as Jazz and Swing was also barred as degenerate music. Jewish composers like Mendelssohn and Schoenberg were also banned. 

Amongst those authors and artists who were suppressed both during the Nazi book burnings and the attempt to destroy modernist fine art in the "degenerate" art exhibition were:

 Ernest Hemingway
 Bertolt Brecht
 Thomas Mann
 John Dos Passos
 H. G. Wells

Artists banned include:

 Elfriede Lohse-Wächtler
 Pablo Picasso
 Claude Monet
 Vincent van Gogh

Composers banned include:

 Gustav Mahler
 Felix Mendelsohn
 Arnold Schoenberg

Dramatists banned include:

 Friedrich Forster

Philosophers, scientists, and sociologists suppressed by Nazi Germany include:

 Albert Einstein
 Niels Bohr
 Edmund Husserl
 Karl Marx
 Friedrich Engels
 Friedrich Nietzsche
 Sigmund Freud
 Max Scheler
 Magnus Hirschfeld

Politicians suppressed by Nazi Germany include:

 Konrad Adenauer
 Theodor Heuss

To avoid censorship, some books were given innocent-looking covers and were called Tarnschriften.

See also 
 Censorship in Germany
 Nazi propaganda
 Degenerate art
 Degenerate music
 List of authors banned in Nazi Germany

References 

Censorship in Germany